HMS Windsor Castle was a 90-gun second rate ship of the line of the English Royal Navy, built by Thomas Shish at Woolwich Dockyard, and launched in 1679.

Windsor Castle commissioned in 1690 under Captain George Churchill and took part in the Battle of Beachy Head on 30 June 1690. In 1692 she was under the command of Captain Peregrine Osborne, and took part in the Battle of Barfleur on 19–24 May 1692. In 1693 she was commanded by Captain John Munden, but was wrecked on the Goodwin Sands on 28 April 1693.

Notes

References

Lavery, Brian (2003) The Ship of the Line - Volume 1: The development of the battlefleet 1650-1850. Conway Maritime Press. .
Winfield, Rif (2009) British Warships in the Age of Sail 1603-1714: Design, Construction, Careers and Fates. Seaforth Publishing. .

Ships of the line of the Royal Navy
1670s ships
Maritime incidents in 1693